Written in Syriac in the late seventh century, the Apocalypse of Pseudo-Methodius shaped and influenced Christian eschatological thinking in the Middle Ages. Falsely attributed to Methodius of Olympus, a fourth century Church Father, the work attempts to make sense of the Islamic conquest of the Near East. 

The Apocalypse is noted for incorporating numerous aspects of Christian eschatology such as the invasion of Gog and Magog, the rise of the Antichrist, and the tribulations that precede the end of the world. The book, however, adds a new element to Christian eschatology: the rise of a messianic Roman emperor. This element would remain in Christian apocalyptic literature until the end of the medieval period.

The book was early translated into Greek, Latin, Coptic, Armenian and later into Slavonic.

Authorship and location
The Apocalypse is attributed to Methodius of Olympus in the Syriac text, of Patara in the Greek, both of whom lived in the fourth century. In all likelihood, however, the text was written in the final decade of the seventh century, after 692, by a Miaphysite Christian, hence the moniker of Pseudo-Methodius. Scholars have argued that the work was written as a contemporary to the Arab Conquests in response to the hardships faced by Christians and widespread apostasy to avoid the jizya head tax. As well, the author sees the invasion occurring as punishment from God. The text, therefore, employs historiography, geography, and apocalyptic prophecy.

The text was originally written in Syriac in Northern Syria. The author claims to have had his vision on Mount Sinjar. Early scholarship, however, lacked the original Syriac text, and so relied heavily on Greek, Latin, and Slavonic texts for study. In 1897, the scholar V. Istrin relied heavily on the Greek text and at the same time, and independently, Sackur studied the oldest Latin translations. Both of these studies ushered in the scholarly study of the Apocalypse, but it was not until 1931 that the original Syriac manuscript was discovered. With this find, Michael Kmosko was able to ascertain that original Apocalypse of Pseudo-Methodius to have been written in the Syriac language.

Content
The Apocalypse is indebted to earlier Syriac works, including the Cave of Treasures, the Julian Romance and the Syriac version of the Alexander Romance.

The Apocalypse begins with a history of the world, starting with Adam and Eve in the Garden of Eden, through to the Muslim conquests, and into the end-times. One notable feature about the work is the presence of sexuality with regards to Christian behavior in the end days—specifically discussing swinging, homosexuality, and cross-dressing as indicators of a sinful society. It is only then that the text says the "sons of Ishmael", that is Muslims, will emerge from the desert of Ethribus to inflict God's punishment upon the Christians who "slipped into depravity". The Apocalypse also recounts the events that took place at the hands of Muslims in the previous decades. In invoking figures in other Christian eschatological literature, such as Gog and Magog, Pseudo-Methodius attempts to legitimize his place as a fourth century Church Father. The manuscript also notes the rise of an Emperor-Saviour figure, echoing the fourth century AD prophecy attributed to the legendary Tiburtine Sibyl. This Roman emperor will save the Christian lands from "the sons of Ishmael", place his crown upon the cross "for the sake of the common salvation of all" thereby saving Christendom as a whole. The work is notable for its vivid description and brutality. Descriptions of drinking the blood of cattle, stabbing pregnant women, and feeding babies to animals permeate throughout the author's work.

Ballard notes, however, that Pseudo-Methodius deviates from previous eschatological literature, such as Revelation, in that the Apocalypse utilizes Roman emperors as agents of change. Guenther notes that Pseudo-Methodius was influenced by the books Revelation and Daniel, maintaining the lineage of Christian literature. This is an important feature as it shows the author was most likely a Christian cleric and was familiar with past Christian writings. By introducing new features into Christian literature while keeping core Christian beliefs and teachings intact helped to make the Apocalypse accessible to the laity, as well. Part of the Apocalypse influence is attributed to its ability to reflect the beliefs of Eastern Roman citizens; they are merely acting out foretold events, and mankind is bound with the fate of the empire and the capital.

Historical context
Rome and Sassanid Persia had been at war with one another for much of the first quarter of the seventh century. With both empires still feeling the effects of such a long series of battles, an Arab threat took advantage of the weakening empires. The Persians faced defeat west of the Euphrates in Qadisiyya in what Griffith calls "the beginning of the demise of both Roman and Persian rule for good". This demise would continue throughout the 630s and 640s, as the Arabs conquered much of the Middle East and the Mediterranean world. In 635, Damascus fell, Jerusalem and Antioch followed in 637, Edessa in 640, Alexandria in 642, and Seleucia/Ctesiphon in 645. Three out of the five patriarchates of Roman Christendom were under Arab Muslim rule. In 674, the Umayyad Caliph Muawiyah launched a land and sea assault on Constantinople. Within three years he was defeated and turned his attention on the rest of the surviving Roman Empire, namely the Middle East, Greece, and the Balkans. As Ballard notes, Constantinople was "reduced to a small Christian enclave within an ocean of Islam."

A campaign by the new Muslim rulers was set in place in order to remove any public display of Christian symbolism through building Islamic-styled buildings and issuing coins declaring an Islamic triumph. The most dramatic of such constructions was the Dome of the Rock in Jerusalem. The inscriptions on the Dome of the Rock are taken from the Quran and "proclaim the arrival of a powerful empire that was founded on pure monotheist belief." This, as Ballard and Griffith both note, was in response to Christians believing in the trinity, and their supposed worship of the Virgin Mary and the Saints something that Muslims saw as polytheistic.

To defend themselves and without any real power or authority, Christians turned to writing. The hardships Christians faced in a Muslim territory caused a "literary awakening", and the earliest of these texts were written in Syriac, Greek, and Arabic. Syriac writers in particular reacted to their world in apocalyptic terms – the fall of their Christian empire was continuing with each Muslim conquest and Syriac writers saw these conquests as a punishment from God. The most well-known of these texts was the Apocalypse attributed to Pseudo-Methodius.

Translations
By the early 8th century, the Apocalypse was translated into Greek and then from Greek into Latin. The earliest Latin witness is a codex dated to 727. There are three other Latin manuscripts from the 8th century. The Latin translation was made by a certain Petrus Monachus in Francia. There was also seemingly a Coptic translation by the 8th century, known only from a fragment on papyrus. All the Greek and Syriac manuscripts, however, are late. There are over 100 Greek copies, but most of them post-date 1453. There are few Syriac manuscripts and many are fragmentary. The best text is from 1586, although there are earlier references found in the 13th-century Book of the Bee. An Armenian translation from the Greek is known from various quotation in Armenian works, but no copy survives. This translation is attributed to Step'anos of Siwnik'.

The Greek text of the Apocalypse is traditionally divided into four recensions called G1, G2, G3 and G4, with G1 subdivided into G1a, G1b and G1c. The Latin and Slavonic translations are both based on G1. The Slavonic versions are divided between three recensions, a Serbian (S1), a Bulgarian (S2) and a Russian (S3). The earliest Slavonic manuscript is of the 12th century. There are four Latin recensions found across about 220 manuscripts. The first and second recensions account for about 50 and 150 manuscripts, respectively. The second and third Latin recensions are heavily abridged.

Spread and influence
The Apocalypse marks the end of antiquity and the beginning of the Middle Ages because of its style and influence. The document was frequently copied and readapted in order to fit the cataclysmic events that occurred in a particular area.

The spread and influence of the Apocalypse was so far reaching that during the Mongol invasions of the 13th century, Russian Christians invoked the work of Pseudo-Methodius in order to explain the onslaught by using the historical and geographical explanations found within the text. As well, Christians believed Pseudo-Methodius had predicted the Mongols' arrival because of their lifestyle, dietary habits, and activities. However, Pelle notes the Apocalypse was not popular in England before the Norman Conquests, despite the popularity of other eschatological literature. Of the almost twenty-four pre-twelfth century Latin manuscripts, only two were in English and none were from before 1075. With the invasion of England by the Normans, however, one of the earliest English texts to explain the invasion of "heathens" on a Christian land included the Apocalypse of Pseudo-Methodius. The Apocalypse was invoked by Christians throughout the centuries in order to explain the turmoil they faced in their respective time and place. As well, it shaped Western Christendom's view of Islam through the Middle Ages because of various re-adaptions and translations. With the fall of more Christian cities from the fourteenth century onwards, along with Constantinople in 1453, the Apocalypse of Pseudo-Methodius was invoked once again.

Modern use
Griffith notes, because of questions surrounding the historicity of the Apocalypse of Pseudo-Methodius, it is easy to dismiss the piece outright. However, for the historian the Apocalypse sheds a light on the environment of the age and therefore the literature is still relevant. Furthermore, the literature is important because of the anonymity of its author. In a sense, this anonymity lends a sense of "underground literature". Furthermore, the Apocalypse of Pseudo-Methodius allowed the population, regardless of locale, to maintain a "sense of seemingly rightful superiority" despite evidence to the contrary.

References

Sources

Pseudo-Methodius, Apocalypse of
7th-century Christian texts
Christian apocalyptic writings
Apocryphal revelations
Pseudepigraphy
Historiography of the early Muslim conquests
Arab–Byzantine wars